Laurie Kingsbury (born May 18, 1992) is a women's ice hockey player who has competed for the Canadian National Women's Under 18 team.

Playing career
She was one of four players from Quebec, (along with Melodie Daoust, Roxanne Douville and Marie-Philip Poulin), who represented Canada at the 2009 IIHF World Women's U18 Championship in Germany.
Daoust was a Montreal Canadiens scholarship holder in 2010 from the Quebec Foundation for  Athletic Excellence. Kingsbury was part of Canada's National Women's Under-18 Team to a gold medal at the 2010 IIHF World Women's Under-18 Championship in Chicago. As a member of the gold medal winning squad, a hockey card of her was featured in the Upper Deck 2010 World of Sports card series. In addition, she participated in the Canada Celebrates Event on June 30 in Edmonton, Alberta which recognized the Canadian Olympic and World hockey champions from the 2009–10 season .

Career stats

Hockey Canada

References

1992 births
Canadian women's ice hockey forwards
Ice hockey people from Quebec
Living people
Sportspeople from Salaberry-de-Valleyfield
Syracuse Orange women's ice hockey players